Botany is the scientific study of plant life.

Botany may also refer to:

Places

New Zealand
 Botany (New Zealand electorate), a New Zealand Parliamentary electoral district
 Botany, New Zealand, a suburb in Auckland, New Zealand
 Botany Town Centre, a shopping precinct in the Auckland, New Zealand suburb

Elsewhere
 Botany, New South Wales, a suburb of Sydney, Australia
 Boťany, a village in Slovakia

Arts, entertainment, and media
 Botany (journal), a scientific journal
 Botany Boyz, a rap crew from Houston, United States

Other uses
 Botany 500, a manufacturer of men's clothing

See also
 Botanic (disambiguation)
 Botanica (disambiguation)
 Botanical
 Botanique (disambiguation)
 Botanist (band), a black metal project
 The Botanist, gin brand
 Botany Bay (disambiguation)
 Plant Biology (journal)
 Plant Science (journal)